The 2019 PSL Grand Prix was the first conference and first indoor tournament for the Philippine Super Liga's seventh season. The formal opening ceremony and games began on February 16, 2019, at the Ynares Sports Arena, Pasig.

Teams

Preliminary round

Team standings	

|}

First round

|}

Second round

|}

Playoffs

Quarterfinals

|}

|}

Semifinals
Best-of-three series

|}

Bronze match

|}

Finals
Best-of-three series

|}

Final standing

Individual awards

Venues
Main venues
Filoil Flying V Arena (main venue)
 Ynares Sports Arena (opening day)

"Spike on Tour" venues
 Strike Gymnasium - Bacoor, Cavite 
 Malolos Sports and Convention Center - Malolos, Bulacan 
 Muntinlupa Sports Complex - Muntinlupa 
 Alonte Sports Arena - Biñan, Laguna

Broadcast partners
 ESPN 5, 5 Plus, One Sports

References

Philippine Super Liga
PSL